Woodbury University is a private university in Burbank, California, with a satellite campus in San Diego.

History

The school was founded in 1884 as Woodbury's Business College by its namesake, F. C. Woodbury, formerly a partner in Heald's Business College in San Francisco, thus making it the second oldest institution of higher learning in Los Angeles and one of the oldest business schools west of Chicago. That historic link between Woodbury and the world of business has been maintained throughout the years. Woodbury was coeducational from its founding, making it one of the earliest colleges west of the Mississippi to admit women. The original mission of Woodbury University was to educate Los Angeles residents in the practical areas of business: bookkeeping, commercial law, and telegraphy. For a time, Woodbury could boast that 10% of Los Angeles' citizenry were attending the institution and its earliest alumni lists form a who's who of 19th century Los Angeles.

In 1931, the division of professional arts was established to focus on fields of design that are most closely allied to business: commercial art, interior design, and fashion design. Woodbury then became a college of business administration and design. In 1969, Woodbury introduced a graduate program leading to the Master of Business Administration (MBA) degree. In 1974, Woodbury College became Woodbury University.

In 1982, Computer Information Systems was added as a major, followed in 1984 by Architecture. In 1987, the Weekend College program for working adults was established with the aid of grants from The Fletcher Jones Foundation and The William Randolph Hearst Foundation. In 1994 the university formally organized its undergraduate and graduate programs into three schools: the School of Architecture and Design, the School of Arts and Sciences, and the School of Business and Management. That year three majors in the School of Arts and Sciences came into being: Psychology, Politics & History and Liberal Arts & Business. Additional undergraduate degree programs have been added in the areas of Marketing, Animation Arts, Communication, and Leadership.

Los Angeles campuses

For the first 103 years, the university followed the growth of the business community based in Central Los Angeles. The school was originally located at 226 South Spring Street in Downtown Los Angeles.  By 1937, it moved to new facilities at 1027 Wilshire Boulevard in the Westlake district, just west of downtown. For 50 years this building served the university's classrooms and administrative needs.

In 1985, the university acquired a  suburban campus in Shadow Hills, Los Angeles. This location was the site of the former Villa Cabrini Academy, a high school for girls run by the Missionary Sisters of the Sacred Heart of Jesus, founded by Frances Xavier Cabrini.  In 1987, the university officially moved into this new campus.  Since it is located within the Burbank post office area, it became known as their "Burbank" campus and it has a Burbank GPS address.

Since 2005, the Los Angeles campus has been home to the Julius Shulman Institute.

Woodbury University San Diego
In 1998 the institution opened a satellite campus in Downtown San Diego, Woodbury University San Diego, where it offers Bachelor of Architecture, Master of Architecture, and Master of Interior Architecture degrees. In Fall of 2008, It moved from Downtown San Diego to the Barrio Logan neighborhood . The new location's building features a computer laboratory, studios, classrooms, and a library.

On November 2, 2021 it was announced that the San Diego satellite campus will be permanently closed by 2024, with all operations being moved to the main university campus located in Burbank, California.

Gallery
The university has a gallery in Hollywood, CA known as WUHO which houses experimental exhibitions and multi-disciplinary collaborations.

Academics
Currently Woodbury University comprises three schools and one college offering graduate and undergraduate programs: The School of Business, School of Architecture, School of Media, Culture & Design, and the College of Liberal Arts. Woodbury undergraduate programs admit students on a rolling basis and the acceptance rate for all undergraduate majors is 56.6%.

Accreditation 
Woodbury University is accredited by the Senior Commission of the Western Association of Schools and Colleges (WASC) and is approved by the Postsecondary Commission, California Department of Education. The Western Association of Schools and Colleges granted Woodbury its original regional accreditation in 1961.

In 1994 the Architecture program was accredited by the National Architectural Accrediting Board (NAAB). In 1991, the Interior Architecture Program was accredited by the Council for Interior Design Accreditation. In 2008, the school received accreditation from the National Association of Schools of Art and Design (NASAD).

Woodbury is accredited by the Association to Advance Collegiate Schools of Business (AACSB). The School of Business received its accreditation from the Association of Collegiate Business Schools and Programs (ACBSP) Spring 1998.

Rankings 

According to QS Ranking Woodbury University Ranking is 251-300 in world.  According to Niche it is #251 in Best Colleges for Art in America.  Based on 66 evaluation factors, Woodbury University art program ranks #1,221 Art School (out of 2097; top 60%) in the United States and #118 Art School in California.

Woodbury University is ranked 48th among the regional universities in West USA, by US News. In 2014, Money Magazine ranked Woodbury University 15th nationally out of the top 25 "Colleges That Add the Most Value".

Woodbury was ranked 34 overall (and eighth among California institutions) in The Economist's first-ever college rankings published in October 2015. It was also ranked 10th among the 161 ranked colleges and universities in California in the 2017 New York Times "Overall mobility index".

Student housing 
Woodbury's Burbank campus has two residence halls with space for approximately 225 residents. South Hall, which is a small building composed mostly of single rooms, was built in the 1960s and houses up to 67 residents. South Hall is one of the original buildings acquired with the Burbank campus and was used as a dormitory for the Villa Cabrini Academy.  North Hall, the larger of the two residence halls, opened in 1990 and houses up to 158 residents.

Annual Fashion Show and Gala 
Since 1964, the university's fashion design students have presented their showcase work at the university's annual Fashion Show held at the historic Millennium Biltmore in Downtown Los Angeles. The show also features a Lifetime Achievement Award to a prestigious designer. In 2019, the award was given to Badgley Mischka.

Notable alumni
 Helen Gurley Brown – Author, publisher, businesswoman, and editor-in-chief of Cosmopolitan magazine for 32 years.
 Cleo Baldon – Landscape architect
 Don Adolfo Camarillo – Land owner, horse breeder
 Richard Denning – Actor
 Brittany Diego – Fashion stylist and founder of Fashion Mentor
 Percy V. Hammon – Republican politician and member of the Los Angeles City Council and California State Assembly
 Lou Kimzey – Magazine editor and publisher
 JaQuel Knight – Choreography and dancer
 Alan Leitner – Abstract artist
 Kenneth Mejia – activist, accountant, and City Controller of Los Angeles
 Star Parker – Republican politician
 Joseph M. Souki – Speaker of the Hawaii House of Representatives
 William Travilla – Costume designer

References

External links
 Official website

 
Universities and colleges in Los Angeles County, California
Universities and colleges in the San Fernando Valley
Universities and colleges in San Diego
Architecture schools in California
Business schools in California
Design schools in the United States
Fashion schools in the United States
Liberal arts colleges at universities in the United States
Buildings and structures in Burbank, California
Private universities and colleges in California
Educational institutions established in 1884
1884 establishments in California
Schools accredited by the Western Association of Schools and Colleges